The Baptist Convention of Maryland/Delaware (BCMD) is a group of churches affiliated with the Southern Baptist Convention located in the U.S. state of Maryland and Delaware. Headquartered in Columbia, Maryland, it is made up of about 510 churches and 11 Baptist associations.

Associations
Arundel Baptist Association
Baltimore Baptist Association
Blue Ridge Baptist Association
Delaware Baptist Association
Eastern Baptist Association
Mid-Maryland Baptist Association
Montgomery Baptist Association
Potomac Baptist Association
Prince George’s Baptist Association
Susquehanna Baptist Association
Western Baptist Association

Affiliated Organizations 
Baptist Family and Children’s Services of Maryland: an organization that ministers to children in need
Baptist Foundation of Maryland/Delaware: the foundation offers investment management services to the Baptist Convention of Maryland/Delaware, associations, and member churches

References

External links 
 BCMD Official Website

 

Baptist Christianity in Maryland
Evangelicalism in Maryland
Protestantism in Delaware